Walter Vásquez Vejarano is a Peruvian lawyer and politician. Vejarano is a former president of the Supreme Court of Peru.

References

Peruvian politicians
Living people
Year of birth missing (living people)
Place of birth missing (living people)
21st-century Peruvian judges